Derqui is a surname. Notable people with the surname include:

Pablo Derqui (born 1976), Spanish actor
Santiago Derqui (1809–1867), Argentine politician
Susy Derqui (died after 1955), Argentine actress and cabaret performer